Robert Sankara (born 18 February 1985) is a Burkinabé international footballer who plays for South African club Free State Stars, as a central defender

Club career
Born in Abidjan, Ivory Coast, Sankara has played club football for Stade d'Abidjan, ASEC Mimosas, Denguélé, Al-Hilal and Free State Stars.

International career
He made his international debut for Burkina Faso in 2012.

References

1985 births
Living people
Ivorian footballers
Burkinabé footballers
Burkina Faso international footballers
Stade d'Abidjan players
ASEC Mimosas players
AS Denguélé players
Al-Hilal Club (Omdurman) players
Free State Stars F.C. players
Association football central defenders
Expatriate footballers in Sudan
Expatriate soccer players in South Africa
Ivorian expatriate footballers
Ivorian expatriate sportspeople in Sudan
Ivorian expatriate sportspeople in South Africa
Burkinabé expatriate footballers
Burkinabé expatriate sportspeople in Sudan
Burkinabé expatriate sportspeople in South Africa
Footballers from Abidjan
21st-century Burkinabé people